Robert Malcolm Chisholm (born January 7, 1947) was a Canadian politician. He served in the Legislative Assembly of British Columbia from 1991 to 1996, as a Liberal member for the constituency of Chilliwack.

References

British Columbia Liberal Party MLAs
1947 births
Living people
Politicians from Brantford